William Peterson (c.1885-?) was an English footballer who played as a goalkeeper for Banfield and Independiente in Argentina.

Career 
William Peterson was born in England, and emigrated to Argentina about the year 1890. He settled with his family in the south of Greater Buenos Aires largely populated by members of the British community.

He began his sport career in the Club Atlético Banfield, and in 1908 he get the third division championship. In 1910, he was runner-up in the Second Division Tournament with Banfield, who faced against the Racing Club de Avellaneda the final for the promotion to the first division. Two year later, he was player of the team Independiente de Avellaneda, playing the 1912 
championship final against Club Atlético Porteño.

References

External links 
eldiariodelrojo.wordpress.com
tn.com.ar
www.soydebanfield.com.ar

Argentine footballers
Footballers from Buenos Aires
English footballers
Club Atlético Independiente footballers
English expatriate footballers
English expatriate sportspeople in Argentina
Expatriate footballers in Argentina
Association football goalkeepers
Club Atlético Banfield footballers
Río de la Plata